AMD Radeon Software is a device driver and utility software package for AMD's Radeon graphics cards and APUs. Its graphical user interface is built with Electron and is compatible with 64-bit Windows and Linux distributions.

Software bundle

Functionality 
Radeon Software includes the following feature set:

 Game profile management
 Overclocking and undervolting
 Performance monitoring
 Recording and streaming
 Captured video and screenshot management
 Software update notifications
 Upgrade advisor

History 
The software was previously known as AMD Radeon Settings, AMD Catalyst, and ATI Catalyst. AMD ceased providing 32-bit versions in October 2018.

Supported hardware 
AMD Radeon Software is targeted to support all function blocks present on a GPU's or an APU's die. Besides instruction code targeted at rendering, this includes display controllers as well as their SIP blocks for video decoding (Unified Video Decoder (UVD)) and video encoding (Video Coding Engine (VCE)).

The device driver also supports AMD TrueAudio, a SIP block to perform sound-related calculations.

Supported products 
AMD Radeon Software supports the following AMD (and ATI-tradition) product lines targeted at rendering:
 Graphics processing units (GPUs)
 Accelerated processing units (APUs)

The following product lines are probably not supported by the AMD Radeon Software, but instead by some other software, which (for example) is OpenGL-certified:
 AMD FireStream product line for GPGPU in supercomputers and such
 AMD FireMV product line for multi-monitor setups (deprecated by AMD Eyefinity being available on all consumer products)
 AMD FirePro product line for professionals who require certified OpenGL support

Multi-monitor support

Starting in Catalyst 14.6 AMD has enabled mixed-resolution support, allowing for a single Eyefinity display group to be created where each monitor runs at a different resolution. The current version may, however, disable any additional display mode and change to a resolution in the one mode available. This feature is made possible through the addition of two new Eyefinity display modes, Fit and Expand, which join the traditional Fill mode. In both Fit and Expand modes, AMD is compensating for the mismatched resolutions by creating a virtual desktop that is of a different resolution from those of the monitors, and then either padding it out or cropping it as necessary.

Before Eyefinity, there was the Windows-only software "HydraVision" (originally acquired from Appian Graphics complete with its development team), a desktop/screen management software mostly providing multi-monitor and virtual-screen management. It has extensive hot-key support.

Video acceleration 
Both of AMD's SIP cores for video acceleration, Video Coding Engine as well as Unified Video Decoder, are supported by AMD Radeon Software.

Audio acceleration 

Some AMD products contain SIP cores for audio acceleration branded AMD TrueAudio. Support for this audio acceleration DSP co-processor is part of AMD Radeon Software.

Under Microsoft Windows the support for AMD TrueAudio is codenamed "ACP" (for audio co-processor) and implemented via "ACP user service" (amdacpusrsvc.exe), a background service that helps manage audio tasks in games.

Under Linux, AMD TrueAudio is codenamed "acp" as well: some code regarding this can be found in the /drivers/gpu/drm/radeon directory of the Linux kernel sources.

Power saving 

AMD Radeon Software includes support for AMD PowerPlay, AMD PowerTune and AMD ZeroCore Power, AMD's set of technologies to reduce energy consumption in their graphics products.

Supported interfaces

Rendering 
The AMD Radeon Software device driver supports multiple rendering interfaces, all designed to give the user-space programs, such as video games or CAD software, access to the corresponding SIP blocks.

Direct3D 

Direct3D 12 is available for GCN with version 15.7.1 or higher.

Mantle 

Only the Radeon Software targeting Microsoft Windows included support for Mantle. In 2019 starting with version 19.5.1 it was officially discontinued, in favor of DirectX 12 and Vulkan (built upon Mantle) raise in popularity. Windows users who still wish to use Mantle would have to use older version of drivers (prior to 19.5.1).

OpenGL 

OpenGL 4.5 is possible for TeraScale 2 and 3 with AMD Radeon Software Crimson Edition Beta (driver version 15.30 or higher like Crimson Beta 16.2.1). OpenCL support will be lost, but it can be recovered by copying the relevant files from a previous package like Radeon Software 15.11.1 Beta. Beta drivers do not support HDCP.

OpenGL 4.5 is available for GCN with version 16.3 or higher.

OpenGL 4.x compliance requires supporting FP64 shaders. These are implemented by emulation on some TeraScale GPUs.

OpenGL 4.6 is supported in AMD Adrenalin 18.4.1 Graphics Driver on Windows 7 SP1, 10 version 1803 (April 2018 update) for AMD Radeon HD 7700+, HD 8500+ and newer. Released April 2018.

Vulkan 

Vulkan 1.0 is available with AMD Radeon Software Crimson Edition 16.3.2 or higher for GCN.

Vulkan 1.1 with AMD Radeon Software Adrenalin Edition 18.3.3 or higher.

Vulkan 1.2 with Adrenalin 20.1.2 or higher.

Vulkan 1.3 with Adrenalin 22.1.2 or higher.

Video acceleration 
The AMD Radeon Software device driver supports multiple interfaces, all designed to give user-space programs, such as GStreamer or HandBrake software, access to the corresponding SIP blocks.

GPGPU

ROCm

OpenCL 

With Catalyst 9.12 support of OpenCL 1.0 was available.

In Catalyst 10.10 OpenCL 1.1 was available.

Catalyst 12.4 Supports OpenCL 1.2.

OpenCL 2.0 driver works since 14.41 for GCN-based Models. This also supports previous OpenCL versions.

TeraScale 2 and 3 chips can use Level 1.2.

Close to Metal 

Close to Metal was a low-level API by AMD which was abandoned in favor of OpenCL.

Other 
AMD HD3D stereoscopic 3D API by AMD.

Heterogeneous System Architecture (HSA) 
 
With Catalyst 14.1 HSA is possible.
AMD main Processor graphic Units and Radeon graphic Card Units work combined.

AMD GPU Services (AGS) 
 GPUOpen: AMD GPU Services (AGS) Library

AMD Display Library (ADL) SDK 
 GPUOpen: AMD Display (ADL) Library
 AMD Display Library (ADL) SDK

Operating systems support

Linux 
The main AMD GPU software stacks are fully supported on Linux: GPUOpen for graphics, and ROCm for compute.
GPUOpen is most often merely a supplement, for software utilities, to the free Mesa software stack that is widely distributed and available by default on most Linux distributions.

AMD strives at packaging its software for Linux on its own, not relying solely on Linux distributions. They do so by using the amdgpu and amdgpu-pro shell scripts, and provide package archives  for e.g. apt and rpm.

Microsoft Windows and Linux 

Starting with version 4.9 (released on 4 September 2004) the Catalyst driver package included the ATI Catalyst Control Center,
a new software application for manipulating many hardware functions, such as 3D settings, monitor controls and video options. It shows a small 3D preview and allows the user to see how changes to the graphics settings affect the quality of the rendered image. It also shows information about the card itself and the software data. This application requires Microsoft .NET Framework.

Radeon Software 16.x and higher only for GCN-based Models. With 16.3.2 Vulkan 1.0 support.

Radeon Software 17.7.1 is the final driver for Windows 8.1

Radeon Software 18.9.3 is the final driver for 32-bit Windows 7/10

Radeon Software 22.6.1 is the final driver for Windows 7 (and Windows 8.1 unofficially); 22.6.1 is also the final driver for GCN 1, GCN 2 and GCN 3 based GPUs

Issues

On Windows Platforms 
 Quantity of rendered ahead frames cannot be adjusted
 Triple buffering in D3D cannot be forced
 V-sync in many games under Windows 7 cannot be forced disabled

On Linux Platforms 
 No support for 3D HDTVs.

See also 
 AMD software
 ROCm
 GPUOpen
 CodeXL

Related technologies 
 AMD CrossFire
 AMD PowerPlay
 AMD Hybrid Graphics
 ATI Avivo

Related topics 
 ATI/AMD on Free and open-source graphics device drivers

Notes

References

External links
 Official website
 AMD Graphics Drivers & Software

AMD software
ATI Technologies
Device drivers
Linux drivers
Proprietary freeware for Linux
Rendering APIs available on Linux
Proprietary software that uses Qt
Software that uses Qt
Third-party Linux kernel modules
X Window System